Zercidium is a monotypic genus of Atlantic comb-footed spiders containing the single species, Zercidium helenense. It was first described by P. L. G. Benoit in 1977, and is found on Saint Helena.

See also
 List of Theridiidae species

References

Monotypic Araneomorphae genera
Spiders of Africa
Theridiidae